Riitta-Liisa Roponen (née Lassila, born 6 May 1978) is a Finnish cross-country skier who has competed since 1998.

Career
She won a bronze in the 4 × 5 km relay at the 2010 Winter Olympics in Vancouver.

Roponen also won two team sprint medals at the FIS Nordic World Ski Championships with a gold in 2007 (with Virpi Kuitunen) and a silver in 2005 (with Pirjo Manninen). Roponen also earned two more gold medals in the 4 × 5 km relay, earning them in 2007 and 2009.

Roponen's best individual finish at the Winter Olympics is sixth in the 10 km freestyle at Vancouver in 2010. She has three individual victories since 2006.

Cross-country skiing results
All results are sourced from the International Ski Federation (FIS).

Olympic Games

 1 medal – (1 bronze)

World Championships
 7 medals – (3 gold, 1 silver, 3 bronze)

World Cup

Season standings

Individual podiums
2 victories – (1 , 1 ) 
8 podiums – (6 , 2 )

Team podiums
3 victories – (3 ) 
22 podiums – (20 , 2 )

References

External links

1978 births
Living people
People from Haukipudas
Cross-country skiers at the 2002 Winter Olympics
Cross-country skiers at the 2006 Winter Olympics
Cross-country skiers at the 2010 Winter Olympics
Cross-country skiers at the 2014 Winter Olympics
Cross-country skiers at the 2018 Winter Olympics
Finnish female cross-country skiers
Tour de Ski skiers
Olympic cross-country skiers of Finland
Olympic bronze medalists for Finland
Olympic medalists in cross-country skiing
FIS Nordic World Ski Championships medalists in cross-country skiing
Medalists at the 2010 Winter Olympics
Sportspeople from North Ostrobothnia
21st-century Finnish women